The Serbian Wikipedia (Vikipedija na srpskom jeziku) is the Serbian-language version of the free online encyclopedia Wikipedia. Created on 16 February 2003, it reached its 100,000th article on 20 November 2009 before getting to another milestone with the 200,000th article on 6 July 2013, and then another milestone with the 500,000th article on 13 January 2018.

It currently has  registered users ( active ones) and more than  articles, making it the largest Wikipedia written in a South Slavic language and the  largest Wikipedia overall.

The Serbian Wikipedia uses ZhengZhu's character mapping program to convert between Cyrillic and Latin scripts.

History

Serbian Wikipedia was created on 16 February 2003 along with the Croatian Wikipedia when both split off from the joint Serbo-Croatian Wikipedia. The main page was translated from English into Serbian on 22 April 2003 by an unknown user with IP address 80.131.158.32 (possibly from Freiburg, Germany), and user Nikola Smolenski finished the translation on 24 May.

During September 2003, Smolenski prepared the main page along with creating some basic article stubs. In the October 2003 issue of the Serbian IT magazine Svet kompjutera his article about wikis and Wikipedia got published, leading to a surge of new users, both registered and anonymous. Around the same time, Smolenski also translated the user interface page into Serbian.

Variants 
Serbian uses two alphabets, Cyrillic and Latin. It also has two official accents: Ekavian and Ijekavian. Combining the scripts and accents give four written variants (Ekavian Cyrillic, Ijekavian Cyrillic, Ekavian Latin, and Ijekavian Latin).

When the Serbian Wikipedia was founded, it used only the Cyrillic alphabet, and both standard dialects. However, since both alphabets are widely used by Serbian native speakers, an effort began to enable the parallel usage of both Cyrillic and Latin alphabets. The first attempt was to use a bot for dynamic transliteration of every article. About 1,000 articles were transliterated before the action was stopped due to  technical difficulties. This concept was later abandoned in favor of a model used by the Chinese Wikipedia. After a few months, the software was completed and now every visitor has the option to choose between two alphabets using tabs at the top of each article. There are special tags used to indicate those words which should not be transliterated (for example, names and words written in foreign languages). Anti-transliteration tags in use are:
 -{text here}-, which prevents transliteration of the article text, and
  or __БЕЗКН__, which prevents transliteration of the article's name.

Though  there are still minor technical issues, Cyrillic-Latin transliteration is working successfully.

Ekavian–Ijekavian conversion, however, is much more complicated, and its implementation is not yet complete (it will probably require extensive tables of words in Ekavian and Ijekavian forms). However, despite the difficulties, this is probably the first successful attempt to develop the software which will allow parallel work on all four variants of Serbian.

Community 

Ever since the inaugural meeting on Tuesday, 15 February 2005, members of the Serbian wiki community have been holding regular gatherings. As of September 2013, 253 meetings took place — mostly in Belgrade, with about a dozen taking place in Novi Sad, along with a few in Niš, Pančevo, and Pirot.

At first congregating at each other's apartments, bars, restaurants, and public parks, by late 2005 community members began gathering at the Belgrade Youth Center, which provided meeting space free of charge. At the first of these Youth Center meetings on Saturday, 3 December 2005, the community members founded the Wikimedia Foundation's local chapter for Serbia and Montenegro called Wikimedia Serbia and Montenegro ( / ). At the time, it was only the fifth local Wikimedia Foundation chapter anywhere in the world.

Following the May 2006 Montenegrin referendum whose outcome led to the breakup of the Serbia and Montenegro state union, the local chapter modified its name to Wikimedia Serbia ( / ). It is registered as a non-governmental, non-partisan, and non-profit organization and its stated goals include promotion of the creation, gathering and multiplication of free content in Serbian as well as promotion of the idea that everyone should have equal access to knowledge and education. Later that year in December, the Serbian chapter hosted the very first Wikimedia regional conference for Southeast Europe.

Three more regional conferences were put together over the next several years, all of them hosted by Wikimedia Serbia.

In February 2012, Wikimedia Serbia organized an event called Open Wiki GLAM of Serbia as part of the bigger project of the same name. Standing for Galleries, Libraries, Archives & Museums, GLAM is devoted to the topics of Serbian cultural and historical heritage as well as protection of intellectual property and copyright on the Internet. Later that year in December, Wikimedia Serbia got its own office space located in downtown Belgrade at the beginning of the King Aleksandar Boulevard where most of the Serbian wiki community meetings now began to take place.

Serbian Wikipedia ranked #1 in the global 1Lib1Ref campaign in 2020.

Gallery

References
 Lih, Andrew. The Wikipedia Revolution: How a Bunch of Nobodies Created the World's Greatest Encyclopedia. Hyperion, New York City. 2009. First Edition.  (alkaline paper).

Notes

External links

  Serbian Wikipedia
  Serbian Wikipedia mobile version (not fully supported)

Wikipedias by language
Internet properties established in 2003
Wikipedia
Serbian websites